Ray Anthony Dominguez (born July 12, 1988) is a former American football offensive tackle. He was signed by the Packers as an undrafted free agent in 2011. He played college football at Arkansas.

On October 12, 2011, he was signed to the Packers active roster from the practice squad.

External links
 Carolina Panthers bio
 Arkansas Razorbacks bio
 

1988 births
Living people
American football offensive tackles
American football offensive guards
Arkansas Razorbacks football players
Carolina Panthers players
Dallas Cowboys players
Orlando Predators players
Green Bay Packers players